Craig Ellis (born January 26, 1961 in Los Angeles, California) is a former gridiron football running back and slotback who played ten seasons in Canadian Football League for five different teams. He also played two seasons in the National Football League. Ellis played college football at San Diego State University.

In 1977 he set a Los Angeles City Single Game Rushing Record, 25-carries, for 367 yards, 7-Touchdowns.
In 1984 he was the first running back in History to lead the CFL with 91-receptions for 871 yards.
In 1985 he led the CFL in receptions with 102-receptions, 977 yards, and tied Joey Walters Saskatchewan-single season record *first running back to catch 102-receptions.
In 1990 he led the CFL in receptions with 106-receptions, 1654 yards.
Ellis finished his career with 88-touchdowns 11th all time CFL

1961 births
Living people
American football running backs
American players of Canadian football
Calgary Stampeders players
Canadian football slotbacks
Canadian football running backs
Edmonton Elks players
Los Angeles Raiders players
Miami Dolphins players
Players of American football from Los Angeles
San Diego State Aztecs football players
Saskatchewan Roughriders players
Toronto Argonauts players
Winnipeg Blue Bombers players
National Football League replacement players
Players of Canadian football from Los Angeles